Eduards Andersons (1 April 1914 – 29 November 1985) was a Latvian basketball player. Andersons won a gold medal at the 1935 EuroBasket competition, becoming the first European champion. He participated also at the 1936 Summer Olympics and at the 1937 EuroBasket.

Career
Andersons was born in Riga then part of Russian Empire. He graduated Riga State Gymnasium No.1 and started law studies at the University of Latvia in 1932. Andersons played basketball since 1930. Since 1933 he played for the university team Universitātes Sports and became a four time Latvian champion (1934-1937). He also participated in 1933 International University Games where the Latvian team won the silver medal and in University games in 1935 and 1937 where Latvia won gold.

Overall Andersons played sixteen games for the Latvian national basketball team. In 1938 Andersons became chief of the sport department of the Presidium Convent. During Nazi occupation of Latvia during World War II Andersons briefly (1943-1944) became chairman of Latvia Basketball Association. Andersons was arrested in 1945 and sent to Gulag camp in Sibiria. He was released in 1956 and returned to Latvia. Rest of his life he worked in Administration of Trams and Trolleys in Riga. He died on 29 November 1985.

References

1914 births
1985 deaths
Basketball players from Riga
People from Kreis Riga
Basketball players at the 1936 Summer Olympics
Olympic basketball players of Latvia
Latvian men's basketball players
University of Latvia alumni
Foreign Gulag detainees